The 1981 Green Bay Packers season was their 63rd season overall and their 61st in the National Football League. The team posted an 8–8 record under coach Bart Starr, earning them a third-place finish in the NFC Central division. Led by the defense the Packers were number one in turnovers forced and number 9th overall. The offense did improve but still finished in the bottom half of the league. Needing a Giants loss or an Eagles win during the final week of the regular season (due to tiebreakers), the Packers gained control of their destiny at earning the final Wild Card spot by winning in their last regular season game but were defeated by the Jets 28–3. The Packers managed only 84 total yards against the Jets.

Offseason

NFL draft

Undrafted free agents

Personnel

Staff

Roster

Regular season

Schedule

Game summaries

Week 1

Week 2: vs. Atlanta Falcons

Week 7: vs. San Francisco 49ers

Week 9: vs. Seattle Seahawks

Week 11

Standings

References 

Green Bay Packers seasons
Green Bay Packers
Green Bay